If You Want Blood may refer to:

 If You Want Blood (EP), a 2007 EP by Matt Pond PA
 If You Want Blood (album), a 2001 album by Mark Kozelek
 If You Want Blood You've Got It, a 1978 live album by AC/DC
 "If You Want Blood (You've Got It)", a song by AC/DC from Highway to Hell